Răzvan Pădurețu (born 19 June 1981 in Bucharest), is a retired Romanian football player.

International career
Pădurețu made one appearance for Romania under coach Răzvan Lucescu, when he came as a substitute and replaced Paul Codrea in the 72nd minute of a friendly which ended with a 2–0 loss against Israel in 2010.

Conviction
On 28 September 2014 Pădurețu was involved in a hit and run road accident while driving his car in Berceni and hit a 44-year-old man who died and then he ran away from the scene. In May 2017 he was sentenced to a jail term of three years and two months.

Titles

References

External links
 
 
 
 

1981 births
Living people
Romanian footballers
Association football midfielders
Liga I players
Liga II players
FC Unirea Urziceni players
CS Minaur Baia Mare (football) players
CSM Focșani players
ACF Gloria Bistrița players
FC Dinamo București players
FCM Câmpina players
ASA 2013 Târgu Mureș players
LPS HD Clinceni players
CS Sportul Snagov players
Romania international footballers